Syncopacma semicostella is a moth of the family Gelechiidae. It was described by Staudinger in 1871. It is found in Ukraine and Russia.

References

Moths described in 1871
Syncopacma